"" is the 24th single by Zard and released 4 March 1998 under B-Gram Records label. The single debuted at #3 rank first week. It charted for 10 weeks and sold over 240,000 copies.

Track list

Usage in media
Iki mo Dekinai: the song was used as opening theme for anime television series Chūka Ichiban!

References

1998 singles
Zard songs
Songs written by Izumi Sakai
Songs written by Tetsurō Oda
1998 songs